Chiesa di San Paolo apostolo is a church in San Marino. It belongs to the Roman Catholic Diocese of San Marino-Montefeltro. It was built from 1898 and consecrated in 1917.

Roman Catholic churches in San Marino
Roman Catholic churches completed in 1898
19th-century Roman Catholic church buildings
1898 establishments in San Marino